Colatina is the second largest city in the north of Espírito Santo, Brazil, 127 km north of the capital Vitória and on the trainline from Vitória to Minas Gerais. It lies on the banks of the Doce river, through which as much as 700 cubic meters of water per second may flow. Its population was 123,400 (2020 est.) and its area is 1,398 km².

History
The first attempts to colonize the area where Colatina now lies were in 1857. 46 people established themselves in the area, which was easy at first, as land had already been assigned to each family. This proved unsustainable, though, when the Indians attacked the colony and massacred quite a number of people. In 3 years, all of the colonists had left the area, and it would be another 30 years before major influx would start up again. Until then, small advances were made along small river tributaries, which went on until 1925. Only after 1928, after the completion of the bridge over the Doce river, did more stable and sustained growth come to the region.

References

External links
 Colatina's Official Website
  History of Colatina
 Short History of Colatina in Portuguese

Municipalities in Espírito Santo